The 20th Regiment, Royal Australian Artillery is an Australian Army regiment which was raised in 2006 as the 20th Surveillance and Target Acquisition Regiment. Responsible for providing artillery spotting and tactical reconnaissance, the regiment has deployed personnel to East Timor, the Solomon Islands, Iraq and Afghanistan, operating a variety of equipment.

History
Consisting of three batteries – the 131st STA, 132nd UAV and CSS Bty – the regiment draws on the lineage of the 20th Locating Regiment, which was disbanded in 1971; the 131st Divisional Locating Battery served with the 1st Australian Task Force during the Vietnam War, having originally been formed in 1954 as a Citizens Military Force (CMF) unit before becoming a regular unit in 1965. The 131st was deployed to Vietnam between 1966 and 1971. The 132nd Locating Battery was also formed as part of the CMF around the same time.

The 131st STA Battery was transferred to the regiment in 2006, and while the remainder of the regiment began forming in 2007. The regiment is responsible for providing the Australian Army with artillery spotting and tactical reconnaissance. The regiment is based at Gallipoli Barracks in Enoggera, Queensland.

All elements of the regiment were formed over the course of several years after 2007. The 132nd UAV Battery was to operate the Army's Israel Aircraft Industries I-View UAVs from 2010, but the acquisition of these UAVs was canceled in 2009. The regiment then operated Boeing ScanEagle UAVs, and deployed UAV detachments to Iraq and Afghanistan. The regiment has also deployed the AN/TPQ-36 Weapon Locating Radar to Iraq. 

On 1 March 2010, 20STA became part of the re-raised 6th Brigade. After the cancellation of the I-View, in August 2010 the AAI Shadow 200 was approved for purchase, with the first systems expected to be operating in Australian hands by the end of 2011. After training in the US, the regiment deployed a battery to Afghanistan in 2012, eventually rotating three batteries through this deployment. The Shadow is due for replacement around 2022.  

As well as deployments to Afghanistan and Iraq, the regiment has also deployed personnel to East Timor and the Solomon Islands. In October 2019, the regiment was renamed the 20th Regiment, Royal Australian Artillery.

Current organisation
The regiment consists of:
Regimental Headquarters
131st Surveillance Target Acquisition Battery
132nd Unmanned Aerial Vehicle Battery
Combat Service and Support Battery

Notes

External links
 Defence Material Office, Project JP 129 – Airborne Surveillance For Land Operations

20
20
Australian army units with royal patronage
Military units and formations established in 2006
Military units in Queensland